is a dam in the Gifu Prefecture of Japan, completed in 1938.

References 

Dams in Gifu Prefecture
Dams completed in 1938